Herschel Randolph "Red" Ramsey (April 9, 1911 – April 19, 1984) was a professional American football player who played end for four seasons for the Philadelphia Eagles. Ramsey was the first football player drafted from Texas Technological College (now Texas Tech University) in the 1938 NFL Draft.

References

1911 births
1984 deaths
American football ends
Georgia Pre-Flight Skycrackers football players
Philadelphia Eagles players
Texas Tech Red Raiders football players
People from Chillicothe, Texas
Players of American football from Texas